Felicidad y Perpetua (Happiness and Everlasting) is the third album by Colombian singer-songwriter Fanny Lu, released by Universal Music Latino on November 21, 2011. As executive producer of the album, Fanny Lu enlisted a variety of producers to collaborate like Andrés Munera, José Gaviria, Steve Greenberg, Mario Balducci, Jesús Miranda and Manuela Mejía. Sonically, the album is rooted in Latin pop, electropop and Ranchera, but also incorporates a variety of other genres such as Vallenato.

One single was released before the album's release: "Fanfarrón". This song topped all the Venezuelan charts and had different entries to the Latin charts. Recently was released her second single "Ni Loca" featuring the Puerto Rican artist featuring Dalmata on December 1, 2011, and she confirmed to the Spain newspaper "El País" that her third single is "Don Juan".

In March 2012, during an interview, Fanny Lu revealed that "Don Juan" would be the third single. On October 2, 2012, this song was released. The video has not yet been recorded, but this could be recorded in late December and premiered in either February or March 2013 before Fanny Lu started her first world tour "Voz y Éxitos World Tour".

Track listing

Charts

References

2011 albums
Fanny Lu albums
Universal Music Latino albums